Alfonso Fernández Mañueco (born 29 April 1965) is a Spanish politician who serves as the President of the Junta of Castile and León since 2019. He is also the chairman of the People's Party of Castile and León since 2017. He served as Mayor of Salamanca between 2011 and 2018.

Biography 
Born on 29 April 1965 in Salamanca, son of Marcelo Fernández Nieto (the Francoist Mayor of Salamanca between 1969 and 1971) and Pilar Mañueco Bocos, he affiliated to the New Generations of the People's Alliance (AP) in 1983. He graduated in Law at the University of Salamanca. He worked for two years as intern in a Law Firm. He was elected as member of the Salamanca Municipal Council in 1995, also becoming a member of the provincial deputation, serving as President of the later institution between 1996 and 2001. He moved then onto the regional government, serving as regional minister of Presidency and Interior and Justice of the Junta of Castile and León in the cabinets presided by Juan Vicente Herrera. He also became a member of the Cortes of Castile and León after the 2003 Castilian-Leonese regional election.

Fernández Mañueco was sworn in as Mayor of Salamanca on 11 June 2011, after the 2011 municipal election.

He replaced Juan Vicente Herrera as President of the People's Party of Castile and León in April 2017.

He effectively renounced to the office of Mayor on 12 December 2018, in order to focus on his bid as PP's prospective challenger to the Presidency of the Government of Castile and León via the May 2019 regional election. At the regional election, PP obtained 29 seats out of 81. After a coalition deal with Citizens, Fernández Mañueco was elected as President of the Junta of Castile and León with the support of 41 out of the 81 members of the Cortes of Castile and León. On 20 December 2021, he announced snap elections in Castile and León after expelling his partners of Ciudadanos from the regional government.

References 

Mayors of places in Castile and León
Members of the 6th Cortes of Castile and León
Members of the 7th Cortes of Castile and León
Members of the 8th Cortes of Castile and León
Members of the 9th Cortes of Castile and León
Members of the 10th Cortes of Castile and León
Members of the 11th Cortes of Castile and León
Government ministers of Castile and León
Presidents of the Junta of Castile and León
Provincial Deputation Presidents of Spain
People from Salamanca
1965 births
Living people